Eighteenth Judicial Circuit Court may refer to:

Eighteenth Judicial Circuit Court of Florida
Eighteenth Judicial Circuit Court of Illinois